St. Matthew's Episcopal Church is a historic Episcopal church located at 5 Chapel Road in Barrington, Rhode Island. It is an active parish in the Episcopal Diocese of Rhode Island.

The congregation began as a mission in 1880, and was established as a parish in 1883, under the guidance of Rev. William Merrick Chapin.  The church building was designed by William R. Walker & Son, and built in 1891.  It is an eclectic mix of Queen Anne and Gothic Revival style.  The attached parish hall was built in 1893.  The complex was listed on the National Register of Historic Places in 1991.

See also

National Register of Historic Places listings in Bristol County, Rhode Island

Notes

External links

Church web site

Episcopal churches in Rhode Island
Churches on the National Register of Historic Places in Rhode Island
Churches completed in 1891
19th-century Episcopal church buildings
Gothic Revival church buildings in Rhode Island
Queen Anne architecture in Rhode Island
Buildings and structures in Barrington, Rhode Island
Churches in Bristol County, Rhode Island
National Register of Historic Places in Bristol County, Rhode Island